Fétigny may refer to:
 Fétigny, Jura, a commune in the region of Franche-Comté, France
 Fétigny, Switzerland, a municipality in the canton of Fribourg, Switzerland